Frances Sarah King (28 November 1980 – 11 September 2003) was a New Zealand cricketer who played as a right-arm fast-medium bowler. She appeared in 15 One Day Internationals for New Zealand in 2002 and 2003, taking 21 wickets at an average of 19.23. She played domestic cricket for Wellington.

In 2001, she was awarded the Trish McKelvey Trophy for the most outstanding player in the national under-21 tournament. In February 2001, she made her international debut against Australia.  

King died suddenly of meningococcal meningitis in Wellington in 2003, at the age of 22.

References

External links
 
 

1980 births
2003 deaths
Cricketers from Wellington City
New Zealand women cricketers
New Zealand women One Day International cricketers
Wellington Blaze cricketers
Neurological disease deaths in New Zealand
Infectious disease deaths in New Zealand
Deaths from meningitis